Skye Lucia Degruttola (born October 2005) is a British child actress, based in London. She is most known for playing Esme Keating in Grantchester, a role she has played from the first episode in 2014.

Personal life 
Degruttola is the daughter of actors Raffaello Degruttola and Simone Lahbib.

Film

Television

References 

21st-century British actresses
Living people
2005 births
British child actresses